The Kingdom of Kandy was a monarchy on the island of Sri Lanka, located in the central and eastern portion of the island. It was founded in the late 15th century and endured until the early 19th century.

Initially a client kingdom of the Kingdom of Kotte, Kandy gradually established itself as an independent force during the tumultuous 16th and 17th centuries, allying at various times with the Jaffna Kingdom, the Madurai Nayak dynasty of South India, Sitawaka Kingdom, and the Dutch colonizers to ensure its survival.

From the 1590s, it was the sole independent native polity on the island of Sri Lanka and through a combination of hit-and-run tactics and diplomacy kept European colonial forces at bay, before finally falling under British colonial rule in 1818.

The kingdom was absorbed into the British Empire as a protectorate following the Kandyan Convention of 1815, and definitively lost its autonomy following the Uva Rebellion of 1817.

Name
Over the years, the Kingdom of Kandy has been known by many names. These include:
 Kanda Uda Pasrata
 The Senkadagala Kingdom
 The Kanda Udarata
 The Mahanuwara Kingdom
 Sri Wardhanapura
 Sinhalé
 Thun Sinhalaya or Tri Sinhala
 Kande Nuwara
 The Kingdom of Kandy

Geography and climate

Much of the Kandy Kingdom's territory was located in Sri Lanka's mountainous and thickly forested interior, with mountain passes to the capital providing plenty of opportunities for defenders to stage ambushes. Routes to the city were kept secret, and spreading information concerning them could often result in death. Many routes into the hill country became impassable during the annual monsoon, and malaria was rife. Throughout its existence Kandyan forces used the land to their advantage, engaging in guerrilla warfare against invading forces, and evacuating major urban centres when enemy forces drew near – a tactic used with particular effect during the Kandyan Wars. Though the kingdom had intermittent access to the port of Batticaloa it had no naval forces and could not prevent the Portuguese and Dutch from maintaining a strong presence in lowland areas.

History

Foundation
The city of Senkadagalapura may have been founded as early as the mid-14th century during the reign of Vikramabahu III of Gampola (1357–1374). Central Sri Lanka was ruled by the kings of Kotte from the early 15th to late 16th centuries; with Kotte's weakening in the face of Portuguese influence the area developed into an autonomous domain with Senkadagalapura at its capital. Following the Spoiling of Vijayabahu in 1521, and the subsequent partition of the kingdom of Kotte, Kandy asserted its independence and emerged as a serious rival to the eastern and southern kingdoms.

Rise: 1521–1594

Following the Spoiling of Vijayabahu in 1521, the kingdom of Kotte split into three competing states – Sithawaka, Raigama, and Bhuvanekabahu VII's kingdom of Kotte. Of these Sithawaka, under the dynamic leadership of Mayadunne, posed the greatest threat to the autonomy of the other states. In 1522, the Kandyans secured Portuguese protection against Sithawaka, but any potential for alliance ended in 1546 when Portuguese and Kotte forces invaded the kingdom. Kandy subsequently lent aid to the Jaffna Kingdom against the Portuguese in 1560.
Kandy territory was invaded twice in the 1570s and 1580s, first in 1574, and then in 1581 by the newly crowned king of Sithawaka Rajasinghe I. Rajasinghe – who had already scored a significant victory over the Portuguese at the Battle of Mulleriyawa – succeeded in annexing the kingdom outright; the Kandyan king Karalliyadde Kumara Bandara (also known as Jayavira III) fled north to the Jaffna Kingdom with his daughter, Kusumasana Devi (also known as Dona Catherina of Kandy) and her husband Yamasinghe Bandara. Both eventually adopted Portuguese worship, converted to Christianity and adopted the names Dona Catherina and Don Philipe respectively. In the meanwhile the Portuguese also laid claim to the Kandyan realm, citing Dharmapala's donation of 1580 as a precedent

Sithawakan rule over Kandy proved difficult to enforce. Wirasundara Mudiyanse, Rajasinghe's viceroy in the area, rebelled soon after the initial conquest; though his uprising was crushed another occurred in 1588. Resistance eventually coalesced around Konnappu Bandara, son of Wirasundara, who had fled to Portuguese lands following his father's murder by agents of Rajasinghe. Between 1591 and 1594, he returned to the area, seized the Kandyan throne under the name Wimaladharmasuriya I and married Dona Catherina. Victories over the Sithawakans and the Portuguese (who occupied Kandy briefly in 1592) secured his position.

The strategic situation in Sri Lanka changed dramatically during Wimaladharmasurya's rise to power. To the north, the Portuguese deposed the king Puviraja Pandaram of the Jaffna Kingdom in 1591 and installed his son Ethirimana Cinkam as client king. In 1594, Rajasinghe I died and the kingdom of Sithawaka disintegrated. Kandy remained the sole native polity outside of European dominance. In 1595, Wimaladharmasuriya brought the sacred Tooth Relic – the traditional symbol of royal and religious authority amongst the Sinhalese – to Kandy, and Kandy entered a long period of attritionary warfare with the Portuguese, starting with the Campaign of Danture.

Consolidation and interactions with the Dutch: 1594–1739 
Hostilities between the Portuguese and the Kandyans continued throughout the rest of Wimaladharmasuriya's reign. The Kandyans lent aid to a rebellion led by Domingos Corrêa and later Simão Corrêa, Sinhalese subjects of Dharmapala, between 1594 and 1596. A Portuguese incursion in 1604 saw them capture Balane, but dissent amongst their Lascarin troops forced a withdrawal back to the coast.

Relations between the Dutch Republic and the Kandyans were initiated on 2 June 1602 when Dutch explorer Joris van Spilbergen arrived at Santhamuruthu on the eastern coast of Sri Lanka. Later that year the Dutch East India Company despatched Sebald de Weert to Kandy in an attempt to negotiate a treaty. The visit ended in disaster when the visitors offended their Kandyan hosts with their behaviour and in the ensuing fracas, de Weert and several of his entourage were killed.

Wimaladharmasuriya died in 1604. The throne passed to his cousin, Senarat, who at the time of the king's death was an ordained priest, but left the sangha and married Dona Catherina. Kuruvita Rala, the Prince of Uva of the Karava lineage, raided the Kandy Kingdom and drove Senerat out of his capital. In 1611 Portuguese forces captured Kandy in the name of the pretender Mayadunne of Uva and torched the city yet again. In 1619, Cankili II was deposed and the Jaffna Kingdom absorbed into the Portuguese Empire. Despite these setbacks, Senarat survived as the king and in 1612 had even concluded a treaty with the VOC. When help came it was in the form of a Danish East India Company fleet which arrived in 1620, but failed to secure Trincomalee and was expelled by the Portuguese.

The Portuguese strengthened their position throughout the 1620s, building forts at Kalutara, Trincomalee, Batticaloa, and in Sabaragamuwa, and upgrading fortifications in Colombo, Galle, and Manikkadawara. A disastrous defeat at the Battle of Randeniwela on 2 August 1630 in which Portuguese captain-general Constantino de Sá de Noronha was killed resulted in large parts of Portuguese Ceilao being overrun by the Kandyans. Internal instability yet again prevented the Kandyans from securing their acquisitions, and by the time of Senarat's death in 1635 lowland Sri Lanka was once again under Portuguese control.

The throne now passed to Senarat's son Rajasinha II, who led the Kandyans to a major victory over the Portuguese at Gannoruwa on 28 March 1638. The battle was to be the last major military victory for the kingdom of Kandy and succeeded in severely weakening the Portuguese presence in Sri Lanka. In May of that year he concluded a wide-ranging alliance with the Dutch, who were by now in control of Batavia. Batticaloa and Trincomalee fell in 1639, Galle in 1640, and Kandyan forces seized Portuguese territories further inland.

Relations between the Dutch and the Kandyans had been difficult from the onset and the alliance fell apart in the 1640s. The two sides joined forces again in the 1650s to expel the Portuguese, but a final break occurred in 1656 in the aftermath of the fall of Colombo after a six-month siege and the final expulsion of the Portuguese from Sri Lanka. Rajasinha demanded that the fort be handed over to the Kandyans for demolition; in November, the Dutch refused and drove the king and his army from the vicinity. Rajasinha's hold over his own population was tenuous, and rebellions against him in 1664 and 1671 gave the Dutch the opportunity to seize large parts of Sabaragamuwa in 1665, as well as Kalpitiya, Kottiyar, Batticaloa and Trincomalee. The seizure of the ports was a serious blow to the Kandyan kingdom – not only were Dutch holdings now more or less coterminous with the territory the Portuguese had held, but all Kandyan trade was now in Dutch hands. Rajasinha attempted to negotiate an alliance with France, who seized Trincomalee but were expelled by the Dutch in 1672. Kandyan campaigns in 1675 and 1684 recaptured some territory, but by the time of Rajasinha's death in 1687 neither city had returned to Kandyan control.

Rajasinha's son ascended to the throne as Vimaladharmasuriya II, and his twenty-year reign (1687–1707) proved relatively peaceable. A trade war broke out in 1701 when the Kandyans closed their borders with Dutch territories in order to stimulate trade through the ports of Puttalam and Kottiyar. As a result, the Dutch lost control of the areca nut trade and retaliated; by 1707 Kandyan borders had reopened and both ports were closed. Upon his death Vimaladharmasurya was succeeded by his son, who ruled as Vira Narendra Sinha. Several anti-Dutch uprisings occurred in the lowlands during the course of the 1720s and 1730s; the Kandyans in turn declared war on the Dutch in 1736 and seized some territory. Hostilities subsided with the appointment of Gustaaf Willem van Imhoff as Governor, and by 1737 the Dutch and Kandyans were once again at peace.

The Nayakkars and the coming of the British: 1739–1803

A succession crisis emerged upon Narendrasinha's death in 1739. The king had one son – Unambuve Bandara – by a Sinhalese consort. However, succession to the Kandyan throne was reserved exclusively for those of kshatriya ancestry on both their mother and father's side, and Unambuve's mother had been of a lower caste. With the support of the bhikku Weliwita Sarankara, the crown passed to the brother of one of Narendrasinha's senior wives, a member of the Telugu-speaking and Tamil-speaking Nayak house from southern India. He was crowned Sri Vijaya Rajasinha later that year. The Nayak Kings were of Telugu origin who practiced Shaivite Hinduism and were patrons of Theravada Buddhism. The Nayak rulers played a huge role in reviving Buddhism in the island. They spoke Tamil, which was also used as the court language in Kandy alongside Sinhala.

Relations between the Sinhalese populace, including the Kandyan aristocracy, and the Nayakkars remained fraught throughout the 18th and early 19th centuries. As early as Narendrasinha's reign, attempts at appointing Nayakkars to prominent positions in court had caused rebellion, including one in 1732 that the king had only been able to crush with Dutch assistance. The Nayakkar nobility – which tended to be exclusivist and monopolise access to the king – was seen as forming an elite group privileged above the native aristocracy, the powerful adigars. Though Sri Vijaya Rajasinha's reign (1739–1747) proved relatively peaceful, his successor Kirti Sri Rajasinha had to deal with two major rebellions. The first, in 1749, was directed at his father Narenappa; the second, in 1760, was a far more dangerous insurrection which attempted to replace him with a Siamese prince. Despite these tensions, however, the Nayakkar dynasty endured, establishing support by their patronage of Buddhism and Kandyan culture.

Throughout the reigns of Sri Vijaya Rajasinha and Kirti Sri Rajasinha the Kandyans launched numerous raids and incursions into Dutch territory, including the annexation of villages in 1741, 1743, and 1745. The Dutch governors, subservient to Batavia, were under strict orders to avoid conflict with the kingdom, without ceding any of their privileges, including the monopoly of the cinnamon trade. In 1761, however, Kirti Sri Rajasinha launched a major invasion of the low country, annexing Matara and Hanwella as well as numerous frontier districts. It was to prove to be a disaster; the Dutch re-captured Matara and Hanwella in 1762, seized Puttalam and Chilaw in 1763, and then drove inland in a two-pronged invasion. The Kandyans evacuated Senkadagala, which the Dutch torched; outlying agricultural lands were also ravaged, leaving the kingdom on the brink of starvation by 1764. Kirti Sri Rajasinha requested assistance from the British in 1762 but failed to secure an alliance. By 1765 the Dutch were in a position to force a treaty upon the Kandyans returning not only the border districts but all of Kandy's coastal provinces to the Dutch; henceforth, the kingdom would be effectively cut off from the outside world. Relations between the Dutch and the Kandyans remained peaceable after this until the final expulsion of the former from the island in 1796.

Though several British sailors and priests had landed in Sri Lanka as early as the 1590s, the most famous was Robert Knox who published An Historical Relation of the Island Ceylon based on his experiences during the reign of Rajasinghe II in 1681. One hundred years later, British involvement in Sri Lankan affairs commenced in earnest with the seizure of Trincomalee by Admiral Edward Hughes as part of general British-Dutch hostilities during the American War of Independence.

The tumult of the French Revolution had spread to the Netherlands by 1795, and Dutch Zeylan sided with the Batavian Republic during the ensuing conflict. The British rapidly annexed Dutch possessions in Sri Lanka, taking Trincomalee (which had been returned to the Dutch in 1794) between 28 and 31 August, Batticaloa on 18 September, and the entirety of Jaffna on 28 September. Migastenne Disawa, the Kandyan ambassador, negotiated a treaty in Madras securing the return of much of the eastern coast to the Kandyans in February 1796; by the 15 of that month, Colombo had fallen and Dutch rule on the island had come to an end.

 
Kirti Sri Rajasinha died in the midst of these events in January 1796, and was succeeded by his brother Sri Rajadhi Rajasinha. The new king rejected the terms of Migastenne's treaty, depriving the kingdom of the opportunity to regain the lands it had lost a generation earlier. It proved to be a fateful decision; the British immediately set about organising their new acquisitions, establishing systems of government, education, and justice. With the appointment of Frederick North (1798–1805) as the first British governor of Ceylon, any hope of the Kandyans regaining their eastern territories essentially disappeared.

Sri Rajadhi Rajasinha died of illness on 26 July 1798 with no heir. The English East India Company and the Crown both had control over the island from 1798 until it became the British crown colony of Ceylon in 1802. Much of the king's reign had been dominated by the powerful First Minister, Pilima Talawe, who now moved to enthroned a young relative of the king, 18-year-old Konnasami as Sri Vikrama Rajasinha. Muttusami, brother-in-law of Sri Rajadhi Rajasinha also claimed the throne of Kandy, but Pilima Talauve arrested him and his sisters. The First Minister, was close to the British however could not control Sri Vickrama Rajasinha, he coveted the throne for himself, and at meetings with the British at Avissawella between 1799 and 1801 requested British assistance in deposing Sri Vickrama Rajasinha. Complex negotiations ensued, with various ideas – including the king being moved to British lands with Pilima Talawe acting as his viceroy in Kandy - were discussed and rejected by both sides.

The territories still possessed by the Dutch on the island were formally ceded to the British in the 1802 treaty of Amiens, but the English Company still retained a monopoly on the colony's trade. Agents of the British were put in charge of lucrative pearl fisheries, cotton plantations, salt, and tobacco monopolies. In the first three years, the government received £396,000 from pearl fisheries. This compensated for the lower price of cinnamon because of Dutch stocks in Amsterdam.

Amidst rising tension, matters came to a head when a group of Moorish British subjects were detained and beaten by agents of Pilima Talawe's. British demands for reparations were ignored by the Kandyans and so North ordered a British force to invade Kandyan lands starting the First Kandyan War. On 31 January 1803, a British force led by General Hay Macdowall marched to Kandy and found it evacuated. The British force installed Muttusami, but he was not respected by the Kandyans. The British were surrounded by hostile people, lacked food, and suffered disease. Macdowall became ill and put Major Davie in charge. The British abandoned Kandy with the sick left behind were put to death. Kandyan forces defeated the retreating British at the Mahavali River, executing Muttusami and all the British prisoners except Davie and three others. This Kandyan war lasted for two years, becoming the longest and most intensive period of the Kandyan Wars, because Governor North continued to send forces to the frontiers.

Annexation and rebellion: 1803–1817

The British fought their way to Kandy, encountering Kandyan resistance led in part by a Malay commander known as Sangunglo. Upon their arrival they found the city deserted. Rather than torching it, they installed a puppet king, Muttusami, and left a small garrison in the town before withdrawing. The Kandyans recaptured the city, leaving only one survivor, and harried British forces down to the Mahaveli river, but were routed at Hanwella. The following year another British incursion resulted in a stalemate, and an uneasy truce was in place by 1805.

In the following decade, Sri Wickrama Rajasinha's increasingly erratic and capricious rule led to serious unrest amongst the population. A major rebellion in the Seven Korales nearly dethroned him in 1808. The powerful Pilima Talawe rebelled in 1810, was captured, and executed. In 1814, the king ordered Ehelepola Adigar, Dissava of Sabaragamuwa, to Kandy. Ehelepola, suspecting a trap, refused; in revenge, the king had his wife and three children executed. Such was the cruelty of the execution that the Kandyan populace, not unused to sights of public execution, now turned en masse against the king. The king was also hugely unpopular amongst the clergy for his sudden and brutal seizures of temple lands.

In November 1814, ten British subjects were captured and mutilated in Kandyan territory. Governor Robert Brownrigg ordered several British forces moved inland from their coastal strongholds in January 1815, accompanied by native forces under Ehelepola. Molligoda, Ehelepola's successor in Sabaragamuwa and Dissava of the Four Korales, defected to the British in February; Kandy was seized on 14 February, and Sri Wickrama Rajasinghe himself captured on 18 February. The king was subsequently exiled to India, where he died in 1832. His son died childless in 1843, bringing the Nayakkar line to an end.

On 2 March 1815, British agents – including Robert Brownrigg and John D'Oyly – met with the nobility of the kingdom and concluded in a conference known as the Kandyan Convention. The resulting agreement allowed for the protection of Buddhism and the preservation of local systems of government under the authority of the British Governor in Colombo and supervised by British agents in Sabaragamuwa, the Three Korales, and Uva. In practice, however, local chiefs such as Ehelepola and Molligoda were acutely aware that they were ultimately answerable to the British, and were in practice junior to British colonial officials who now had free access to their domains.

Rebellion broke out in 1817 in the Wellassa region, spreading rapidly to Uva and Walapane. Keppitipola, Dissave of Uva, was sent to quash the uprising, but defected and joined the rebels instead. By July, every major Kandyan chief except Molligoda had joined the rebellion; several, including Ehelepola, had already been captured. Brownrigg responded to the rebellion by ordering that all males between 15 and 60 years of age in Uva Province to be driven out, exiled or killed. In addition, the irrigation systems in Uva and Wellassa were destroyed, "one hundred thousand" paddy fields in Wellassa were burnt, all property was appropriated, and cattle and other animals were slaughtered en masse. Brownrigg also issued a Sri Lanka Gazette Notification that condemned anyone who participated in the Great Uprising with property confiscation, extradition to Mauritius, and even execution. (This Gazette Notification labelling the rebels as "traitors" was only revoked two centuries later, in 2017, with 81 leaders of the freedom struggle being formally declared as National Heroes.) Molligoda, however, ensured the road to Kandy remained open and on 30 October Keppetipola was captured. His associate Madugalle Adikaram was captured on 1 November, and thereafter the rebellion collapsed. Both leaders were beheaded on 26 November 1817. Viewing the convention as null and void, the British set about breaking the power of the nobility. Though smaller uprisings occurred in 1820, 1823, and 1824, none of them seriously threatened the British government of the highlands.

The area of the central highlands in which the Kandyan kingdom was situated had the natural protection of rivers, waterways, hills and rocky mountainous terrain. The prominent location of the Kandyan kingdom with its cool climate had greatly contributed to protecting the independence of the nation for nearly three centuries.

Administration

King 

According to the Kandyan administrative system, the king was head of all spheres. He was also known as "Lankeshwara Thrisinhaladheeshwara". It was accepted that the king owned all lands and therefore was known as "Bhupathi". Even though the king was called "Adeeshwara", it was customary to consult the principal chiefs and Buddhist priests. The king had to follow the customs and traditions which were in popular practice at that time, otherwise, the people would rebel against him if he did not. Not obeying these would be detrimental to the power of the king, an example being Vikrama Rajasinha, who had to surrender to the British, merely because he ignored the advice of the Buddhist priests and chieftains and did not follow the age old traditions. The King would have judicial authority in civil and criminal cases.

The kings of Kandy became the rulers of the whole island with Vimaladharmasuriya I.

Offices of state 
The King would appoint persons deemed trustworthy and capable to high offices of state.

Adikar

The highest offices of state were that of the two Adikars (known as Adikarams) called Pallegampahe and Udagampahe, holding equal powers and privileges within their jurisdiction. The Pallegampahe Adikar held precedence over the Udagampahe Adikar. The Adikars are distinguished from the other chiefs with the honour of the title of Maha Nilame (Great Officer). There was no time limit for the office holder as he held the post at the pleasure of the King, which meant throughout his life, if not incurred the displeasure of the King. The police and the jails were under their control. Adikars were consulted on the appointment of all other chiefs, the chief priest as well as for grants of lands, or rewards for services. It was not hereditary, although members of the same family have been appointed.

Disawe

Dissava were provincial governors. The Kandyan kingdom consisted of twenty-one provinces of which twelve principles are called Desavonies with each placed under a chief called a Dissava who served as its governor.

These are:

Hathara Koralaya (The Four Korales)
Hath Koralaya (The Seven Korales)
Uva
Matale
Sabaragamuwa 
Thun Koralaya (The Three Korales)
Walapane
Udapalala
Nuwarakalawiya
Wellassa
Bintenne
Tamankaduwa

Appointed by the King, a Dissava had administrative and judicial authority both civil and criminal over the Desavonies as king's personal representative. They had jurisdiction over all persons and lands within their province, except for those attached to the King's court or household. There was no time limit for the office holder as he held the post at the pleasure of the King, which meant throughout his life, if not incurred the displeasure of the King. It was not hereditary, although members of the same family have been appointed.

Lekam
Lekams (Secretary in Sinhala) were chiefs of departments of the Kandyan kingdom.

Rate Mahatmaya

Rate Mahaththayas were governors of smaller districts namely Udanuwere, Hewahete, Yatinuwere, Kotmale, Tunpanahe, Dumbara.

Diyawadana Nilame

Diyawadana Nilame was an officer of the Royal household, charged with safeguarding and carrying out ancient rituals for the Sacred Relic of the tooth of the Buddha. The Diyawadana Nilame has the responsibility of overseeing all aspects of the Sri Dalada Maligawa. One of his principal duty of organizing the annual pageant, the Kandy Esala Perahera.

Law and criminal justice 

The Kingdom of Kandy was governed by customs and traditions that have descended over the centuries which forms the basis of both the civil and criminal legal system that existed in the kingdom. Parts of this traditional law have been codified into the current legal framework of Sri Lanka as the Kandyan law. The King had ultimate judicial authority in civil and criminal cases in both original and appellate cases. Principle chiefs exercised civil and criminal jurisdiction over persons within their jurisdiction.

Maha Naduwe

The Maha Naduwe (the Great Court) consists of the King, Adikars, Disawes, Lekams, and the Mohandirams forms the highest court of the land held in different times and locations hearing both civil and criminal cases. The court language of Kandy was under the Nayaks was the Tamil language.

Military

The Kingdom of Kandy did not maintain a large standing army. The King maintained a full-time Royal Guard at the Palace. In the provinces, local garrisons were maintained to guard strategic mountain passes or to suppress rebellions. During times of war or military campaign, these would be supplemented with local militia.

Kandyan forces, throughout their history, relied heavily on the mountainous terrain of the kingdom and primarily engaged in guerrilla-style hit-and-run attacks, ambushes, and quick raids. One of the hallmarks of the clashes between the kingdom and its European foes was the inability of either side to take and hold land or to permanently cut off supply routes, with the exception being the Dutch, who managed to do so for an extended period of time in 1762.

In the 16th and 17th century, the Kandyan Kings relied on mercenaries, often Telugu military adventurers. With the arrival of the Nayakkars, large numbers of South Indian Tamil soldiers made up the king's personal guard. In addition to this, various Europeans were in the King's service during this period (including a master gunner), and large contingents of Malays, who were very highly regarded as fighters.

As for the armies, each of the local chieftains could call upon a militia that often accompanied them on their journeys around the kingdom. The bulk of the Kandyan army consisted of local peasant conscripts – irregulars pressed into service in times of war – who tended to bring with them around twenty days' worth of supplies and functioned in discrete units often out of contact with each other. One of the reasons for the Kandyan's inability to hold the land they captured was poor logistical support, as many soldiers had to return to base to replenish their supplies once they ran out.

By the 1760s bows and arrows had been phased out in favour of firearms. Kandyan gunsmiths specialised in manufacturing light flintlocks known as Bondikula with smaller bores than European guns, with their barrels extended for accuracy. Larger bondikula guns known as Maha thuwakku were used as Wall Guns, they weighed around 28 kg and were mounted on a tripod where the gunner would rest the butt stock from the chest to the shoulder before firing. In addition to field artillery similar to that of Europeans Kandyans also developed a unique form of light cannon better suited for mountain warfare called the kodithuwakkuwa which consisted of a gun barrel placed on a wooden stock supported by a wooden block or iron forelegs.

Royal Palace

The Royal Palace of Kandy is a historical palace complex located in the city of Kandy, Sri Lanka, and was the official residence of the kings of the Kingdom of Kandy before the British colonization in 1815. The palace complex is a remarkable example of traditional Kandyan architecture, adorned with intricate wood and stone carvings, and murals on the walls. It comprises several buildings, including the Audience Hall, the Queen's Palace, the King's Palace, and the famous Temple of the Tooth Relic. The Temple of the Tooth, one of the most revered Buddhist temples in the world, is also located within the palace complex. The palace complex and the Temple of the Tooth are both designated as UNESCO World Heritage Sites.

The city of Kandy was built in a stunning pattern of twelve cycles by the kings of Kandy, showcasing their grandeur and architectural prowess. However, after the fall of the kingdom to British invaders, the once glorious landscape was cruelly altered beyond recognition.

Economy
During the reign of Vimaladharmasuriya I many steps were taken to develop and improve the economy of the Kingdom of Kandy. He took steps to improve the iron industry the Uva Province and agriculture in places such as Kothmale, Walapane, Harispaththuwa, Uva, Hewaheta, Udunuwara, Yatinuwara and Ududumbara.

Imports of the Kandyan Kingdom included silk, tea, and sugar while exports included cinnamon, pepper and areca nut.

The Kingdom of Kandy used multiple currencies some of which originated from its predecessor the Kingdom of Kotte. The Silver coins 'Ridi (Massa)' and 'Panama' were introduced by the end of the 16th century while the gold coins ‘Ran Panam’ and ‘Ran massa’ had been introduced earlier. Later the 'Thangam Massa', 'Podi (small) Thangama', 'Ridiya' were introduced. By the 18th century the ‘Waragama’ originating from India and the copper coin ‘Salli’ became widespread with an exchange rate of one 'Ridiya' for sixty-four 'Salli' coins. The influence of the Dutch resulted in the Stuiver entering circulation gaining the name 'Thuttu' among Sinhalese. Hook-shaped coins the Larin were already in use during the Kingdom of Kotte and is believed to have been introduced by Persian traders. These were locally replicated as Angutu Massa with a silver finish.

Administrative divisions

Divisions
In the early years of the kingdom, it consisted of areas or divisions.

Rata Wasama
Rata Wasama was the provincial administration of the subdivisions of the Mahanuwara area in kingdom of kandy. There were nine Rata wasamas.

Uda Nuwara

Yatinuwara

Thumpane

Harispattuva

Dumbara

Heva heta

Kothmale

Uda Bulathgama

Patha Bulathgama

Demographics

Language

Religions

The state religion was Buddhism. Due to the activities of the Portuguese, ordained Buddhist monks were absent by the Dutch era. After the arrival of the Nayak dynasty, Buddhism was again firmly established in the island. The dynasty of Vimaladharmasurya I largely tolerated the presence of Christians, in particular Catholics fleeing Portuguese land following their occupation by the Dutch. On occasion, the Kandyan kings even protected Catholic agents, most famously Vimaladharmasurya II's protection of Joseph Vaz. The religious environment, however, changed dramatically with the arrival of the Nayak dynasty. In 1743 Sri Vijaya Rajasinha ordered churches burned and commenced a general repression of the faith, which continued until Kirti Sri Rajasinha commanded its cessation.

Art and architecture

See also
 History of Sri Lanka
 Kandyan era frescoes
 Kastane
 Stranger King

References

External links
 British Ceylon and Kingdom of Kandy 1805 (map)
 Kandyan Kingdom
Discover Charming Kandy

 
Kingdoms of Sri Lanka
Former countries in South Asia
Former monarchies of South Asia
1815 disestablishments in Ceylon
History of Kandy
1469 establishments in Asia
15th-century establishments in Sri Lanka
States and territories established in the 1460s